Rui Gil Soares de Barros (born 24 November 1965) is a Portuguese former professional footballer who played as an attacking midfielder, currently a manager.

He played with success in Portugal (at Porto), Italy – at Juventus – and France (two clubs), later becoming a manager. Over eight seasons, he amassed Primeira Liga totals of 191 matches and 43 goals, all with Porto.

Barros represented Portugal on 36 occasions, scoring four goals.

Club career

Early years and Porto
Born in Paredes, Porto District, Barros began his senior career with S.C. Covilhã in the Segunda Liga. He helped Varzim S.C. to promote to the Primeira Liga in his second season as a professional.

Barros signed with FC Porto for 1987–88, immediately having an impact: 12 goals in the league, which ended with the championship conquest, also being essential as the northerners began the campaign with two major achievements, the European Super Cup against AFC Ajax and the Intercontinental Cup against Peñarol (he also scored in the first leg of the Super Cup final). As a result, he was voted Portuguese Footballer of the Year.

Abroad
Barros joined Italian side Juventus F.C. in the summer of 1988, where he chose to wear the number 8 shirt, turning down the opportunity to wear the prestigious number 10 shirt which had previously belonged to the recently retired Michel Platini, whose role he had inherited at the Turin club. During his two-year tenure, he scored 19 goals in 95 appearances in all competitions and helped to a Coppa Italia and UEFA Cup double in 1990.

Subsequently, Barros moved to AS Monaco FC, originally for one year (eventually three). During his spell, he notably lost the final of the 1991–92 European Cup Winners' Cup to SV Werder Bremen.

In the 1993 off-season, Barros signed with another team in France, Olympique de Marseille, teaming up with compatriot Paulo Futre – who left Porto for Atlético Madrid precisely the year he arrived. The former contributed in helping them to a second-place finish in the league, although the club was relegated following its involvement in a match fixing scandal.

Return to Porto
In the summer of 1994, Barros returned to Porto, where he became an important attacking element in four of five consecutive league wins. He retired from football in June 2000, at the age of 34.

Barros stayed connected to his main club after his retirement, as a manager. After Co Adriaanse resigned in August 2006 during the preseason, he was appointed interim coach for two matches, against England's Portsmouth (2–1) and Manchester City (1–0).

Barros was also on the bench for the 3–0 win over Vitória F.C. in the domestic supercup, on 19 August 2006. Jesualdo Ferreira was appointed shortly afterwards, and he stayed as his assistant during the following campaigns as Porto won the league four times in a row.

On 13 June 2018, Barros succeeded former Porto and Portugal teammate António Folha at the helm of Porto's reserves, who competed in the second tier. On 3 February 2021, with the team dead last with 16 games remaining, Folha was put back in the position.

International career
Whilst at Varzim, Barros was noticed by the Portugal national team, and made his senior debut on 29 March 1987 in a 2–2 draw against minnows Malta for the UEFA Euro 1988 qualifiers, playing the second half of the match held in Funchal, Madeira. During his time with Juventus he was already a leading player, although he was unable to help his country qualify for the 1990 FIFA World Cup to be held in Italy.

Barros was overlooked for the squad picked by manager António Oliveira for Euro 1996 in England. His last cap came on 14 December 1996 in a 0–0 draw with Germany in the 1998 World Cup qualifying phase, in Lisbon.

Style of play
A dynamic and hard-working team player, Barros was a diminutive attacking midfielder who was known in particular for his speed, stamina and technical ability, which allowed him to excel in Juventus' counter-attacking style of play under manager Dino Zoff. Tactically versatile, he was capable of playing in several offensive midfield and attacking positions.

Career statistics

|}

Managerial statistics

Honours

Player
Porto
Primeira Divisão: 1987–88, 1994–95, 1995–96, 1996–97, 1997–98, 1998–99
Taça de Portugal: 1987–88, 1997–98, 1999–00
Supertaça Cândido de Oliveira: 1993, 1994, 1996, 1998, 1999
European Super Cup: 1987
Intercontinental Cup: 1987

Juventus
Coppa Italia: 1989–90
UEFA Cup: 1989–90

Monaco
Coupe de France: 1990–91
UEFA Cup Winners' Cup runner-up: 1991–92

Individual
Portuguese Footballer of the Year: 1988

Manager
Porto
Supertaça Cândido de Oliveira: 2006

References

External links

1965 births
Living people
People from Paredes, Portugal
Sportspeople from Porto District
Portuguese footballers
Association football midfielders
Primeira Liga players
Liga Portugal 2 players
S.C. Covilhã players
Varzim S.C. players
FC Porto players
Serie A players
Juventus F.C. players
Ligue 1 players
AS Monaco FC players
Olympique de Marseille players
UEFA Cup winning players
Portugal under-21 international footballers
Portugal international footballers
Portuguese expatriate footballers
Expatriate footballers in Italy
Expatriate footballers in Monaco
Expatriate footballers in France
Portuguese expatriate sportspeople in Italy
Portuguese expatriate sportspeople in Monaco
Portuguese expatriate sportspeople in France
Portuguese football managers
Primeira Liga managers
Liga Portugal 2 managers
FC Porto managers
FC Porto B managers
FC Porto non-playing staff